Misunderstanding Cults: Searching for Objectivity in a Controversial Field was edited by Benjamin Zablocki and Thomas Robbins.  The book was published by University of Toronto Press, on December 1, 2001, and includes contributions from ten religious, sociological, and psychological scholars.

The book is unique in that it includes contributions from scholars who have been labeled as "anti-cult", as well as those who have been labelled as "cult apologists".  The book features a section which discusses the need for scholarly objectivity when researching cults, as well as emphasizing the danger of partisanship while researching these controversial groups.  Other topics discussed include brainwashing, cult violence, the conflict that exists between new religious movements and their critics, as well as the ramifications of raising children in controversial religious movements.

Contributors
The book includes contributions from researchers with varied viewpoints on the subject of cults:
Dick Anthony
Benjamin Beit-Hallahmi
David Bromley
Lorne L. Dawson
Jeffrey Kaplan
Stephen A. Kent
Janja Lalich
Susan J. Palmer
Thomas Robbins
Julius H. Rubin
Amy B. Siskind
Benjamin Zablocki

Reception 

William Sims Bainbridge frames the book as part of the debate whether sociology of religion is truly scientific. He notes that a lot of the debate in the book is centered on the validity of brainwashing as a concept. He writes that "In many respects this is an excellent book, containing insightful essays written from a variety of perspectives," noting however that "Not a single paper in the collection makes use of quantitative data or conducts any other kind of formal theory testing," and decrying the scarcity of connections to research on group influence from social psychology or sociology in general. Bainbridge also writes that

See also
List of cult and new religious movement researchers

References 

2001 in religion
2001 non-fiction books
Books about cults
Religious studies books
University of Toronto Press books